Between 1940 and 1944 there were some 25 cases of German submarines secretly resupplied in Spanish ports. The practice was pre-agreed between both governments in 1939, but faced with British protests related to breach of neutrality commitments, Spain started to withdraw from the scheme since late 1943.

Background

The German supply system intended to serve the navy overseas, named Etappendienst, was set up in 1911. Its key section, designed to supply warships active in the Atlantic, was based in Spain, and operated especially in 1914–1915. Dissolved after the war, Etappendienst was re-established in the mid-1930s; initially part of the Abwehr, in mid-1938 it was moved to the Foreign Section of OKW. Though technically one of 4 global Etappendienst centres, Spain became the focus of the plan; in 1934-1935 by means of various front companies the Germans constructed a network supposed to ensure supplies of fuel, sourced mostly in Latin American countries. Following disruption caused by the Spanish Civil War, the works were resumed in 1938. They were paired with official diplomatic efforts directed at the Franco government, and included plans of German investment and co-ownership of the CEPSA refinery in the Canary Islands. The Spanish Nationalist government remained cautious and in early 1939 OKW issued a directive which envisioned nothing more than “benevolent neutrality” of Spain should a major European conflict begin. This marked German reversal to the concept of supplies through cover organizations, though operated with consent of the Spanish administration.

Negotiations

In 1939 the Berlin and the Madrid governments discussed various options of implementing the scheme; plans varied between using Spanish or German merchant ships, servicing only submarines or also surface vessels including cruisers, replenishment taking place in ports or in some isolated bays, purchases of fuel/supplies being made in Spain or abroad. At one point, discouraged by Spanish reluctance, delays and ambiguity, the Germans considered reverting to entirely clandestine operations, but given tightly controlled market and heavy policing in post-war Spain, the option was abandoned as entirely unfeasible. Given domination of the Royal Navy, the Spaniards were principally concerned with a would-be British counter-action; on the other hand, also the Germans worked under instructions not to compromise Spanish neutrality. The final agreement was reached by Beigbeder and Stohrer in November 1939. It covered submarines only; they were to draw at night alongside a German tanker anchored in the port, take on supplies and sail off before dawn. Spanish authorities were supposed to close their eyes and enable provisions from land depots.

Replenishment operations

Sources differ and list 25-26 cases of German submarines serviced in Spanish ports documented, taking place between January 1940 and February 1944: 5 in 1940, 16 in 1941, 3 (2) in 1942, none in 1943 and 1 (0) in 1944. Most were scheduled operations and 3 were emergency cases. The ports used were Vigo (7-8), Las Palmas (6), Cádiz (6) and El Ferrol (5). Overall, there were 1,508 tons of gasoil and 37 tons of heavy oil pumped; in most cases there was also lubricants, water and foodstuffs delivered, in some cases navigation charts and first-aid kits, and in 3 cases there were torpedoes loaded. In few cases injured or sick German sailors were taken off the ship. Almost all cases were overnight operations, though two emergency repairs took a few days. There were 4 German supply ships ("Thalia", "Bessel", "Max Albrecht" and "Corrientes") involved. In one case the replenishment operation was abandoned, as it turned out that the submarine in question was damaged and unfit for the process. On the navy side the operations were co-ordiated by Oberkommando der Marine, in Spain the process was managed by the German navy attaché in Madrid, Kurt Meyer-Döhner.

Phasing out

Though usually performed in total secrecy, in few cases replenishment operations lasted until daylight and even attracted some crowds watching from the shores. The British gained indication of provisioning, but lacked evidence, especially that since July 1940 Franco, disappointed with Hitler's refusal to discuss Spanish territorial claims in Africa, suspended supply operations; they were resumed in March 1941. In July 1941 the British embassy in Madrid lodged a formal protest, pointing to breach of Spanish neutrality obligations. Since mid-1941 the British intelligence had already irrefutable proof, and in late 1941 they captured sailors from U-434, shortly after she had re-fuelled at Vigo. Following a series of British protests, in late 1941 the Spanish terminated their operations in the Canary Islands and in late 1943 they scaled down the process altogether, in principle reduced to emergency operations. In May 1942 the Spanish for the first time interned a German submarine which sought refuge following combat damages, the submarine was eventually sold to the Spanish Navy; 1 other case is known for 1943. Usually the German crew were initially interned, but under various circumstances they made it back to Germany.

Footnotes

Further reading

 Charles B. Burdick, ‘Moro’. The Resupply of German Submarines in Spain, 1939-1942, [in:] Central European History 3/3 (1970), pp. 256–284
 Juan José Díaz Benítez, Submarinos en Canarias durante la Segunda Guerra Mundial, [in:] Annuario de Estudios Atlanticos 65 (2018), pp. 1–17
 Juan J. Díaz Benítez, The Etappe Kanaren: A case study about the secret supply of the German Navy in Spain during the Second World War, [in:] International Journal of Maritime History 30/3 (2018), pp. 472–487
 Dieter Jung, Martin Maass, Berdnt Wenzel, Tanker und Versorger der deutschen Flotte 1900-1980e Stuttgart 1995, 
 Jak Mallmann-Showell, Nazi Uboats – Landings on Hostile Shores, London 2000, 
 Jaime Rubin Laforet, Historia oculta de Canarias, Barcelona 1997,

External links
 on resupplies according to Deutsches U-Boot Museum

Francoist Spain
20th century in Spain
Neutral states in World War II
Spain in World War II
Germany–Spain relations
Foreign relations of Spain during the Francoist dictatorship